Shrady is a surname. Notable people with the surname include:

Frederick Charles Shrady (1907–1990), American painter and sculptor
George Frederick Shrady, Jr., (1862–1933), American police officer
George Frederick Shrady, Sr. (1830–1907), American physician
Henry Shrady (1871–1922), American sculptor